Ernst von Ratzeburg or Rassburg (died 5 March 1279) was a member of the Livonian Order. He acted as its Master from 1273 until his death at the Battle of Aizkraukle, at which he was one of 71 members of the Order to die.

Sources
 Ritterbrüder im livländischen Zweig des Deutschen Ordens. Köln: Böhlau, 1993. Nr. 695 (lk 524–525).
 Theodor Hirsch, Max Töppen, Ernst Strehlke: Scriptores Rerum Prussicarum: Die Geschichtsquellen der Preussischen Vorzeit bis zum Untergange der Ordensherrschaft, Leipzig 1861, lk. 640

Masters of the Livonian Order
1279 deaths
Rulers of Estonia
Military personnel killed in action